DKP can refer to:

Media
 Currency in the simExchange video game
 Dragon kill points in online games
 DKP Studios, later Jam Filled Entertainment, a visual effects studio

Political parties
 Danmarks Kommunistiske Parti, the Communist Party of Denmark
 Deutsche Kommunistische Partei, the German Communist Party
 Deutsche Konservative Partei, alternate name of the Deutsche Rechtspartei, former far-right political party in Germany
 Devrimci Komünarlar Partisi, Revolutionary Communard Party, Turkey

Other uses
 Diketopiperazine, a class of organic compounds
 2,5-Diketopiperazine, a specific form
 Duffin–Kemmer–Petiau algebra, in quantum field theory
 Don King Productions